Raja Sher Singh Attariwala was a royal military commander and a member of the Sikh nobility during the period of the Sikh Empire in the mid-19th century in Punjab.

He commanded the Sikh Khalsa army in the Second Anglo-Sikh War against the British East India Company. His father was General Chattar Singh Attariwalla. General Sher Singh and the army, under his command, gave a devastating blow to the British Army at Chillianwala. Under his command the Sikh Khalsa Army managed to successfully defend its position against a British army at the Battle of Chillianwala. Both armies retreated after the battle, with both sides claiming victory, although it became clear after the rains subsided that the Sikhs had defeated the British.. It was one of the hardest fought battles in the British Army's history. The loss of British prestige at Chillianwala was one of the factors that contributed to the Indian Rebellion of 1857 some nine years later. Within the British Army, such was the consternation over the events in the battle that, after the disastrous Charge of the Light Brigade, when Lord Lucan remarked "This is a most serious matter", General Airey replied, "It is nothing to Chillianwalah." 
With the establishment of British control, Sher Singh Attariwalla was forced into exile from Punjab. The British feared that such a powerful leader could reignite a full-scale war with them. Sher Singh died in exile, at Benares in 1858, away from his Punjabi homeland.

References

External links
Article on Battle of Chillianwallah - second Anglo-Sikh war

Sikh warriors
Punjabi people
1858 deaths
People of the Second Anglo-Sikh War
Year of birth missing